The Philippines men's national floorball team is the national floorball team of the Philippines and is organized by the Philippine Floorball Association.

History

The men's national team made their debut at the 2014 Southeast Asian Floorball Championships which was hosted in Singapore. The Philippines lost all its four games at its first tournament against the national teams of Indonesia, Malaysia and Singapore.

The Philippines participated in the inaugural 2017 Asia Oceania Floorball Confederation Tournament in Bangkok with no prior victory in an international floorball match. Their 4–3 win over China on July 1, 2017 in the continental tournament became their first victory in an international floorball match. They planned to enter the qualifiers of the 2018 World Floorball Championships, but did not compete in the end.

The 2019 Asia Oceania Floorball Confederation Tournament was hosted at home in Biñan with the Philippines recruiting Filipinos with links to Sweden in a bid to improve their performance. They finished bronze by beating South Korea in the third place play off.

They entered the Asia-Oceania qualifiers for the 2020 World Floorball Championship but withdrew amidst concerns over the COVID-19 pandemic. However, they were given a wildcard berth for the world championship following the withdrawal of Australia and Japan allowing them to participate in the tournament for the very first time. They failed to progress to the first playoff round, losing to Estonia and Canada but managed to secure a win against Singapore. The Philippines won against the United States to advance to the 13th place playoff. They lost to Thailand in penalties settling for 14th place.

The Philippines qualified for the 2022 World Floorball Championship. Unlike the previous edition, they earned a berth through participating in the qualifiers.

Fixtures and results

Players 

The following is the roster for 2020 World Championships.

Current coaching staff

Records

World Championships
 Champions   Runners up   Third place   Fourth place

Asia-Oceania Floorball Cup 
 Champions   Runners up   Third place   Fourth place

Southeast Asian Floorball Championships 
 Champions   Runners up   Third place   Fourth place

Southeast Asian Games 
 Champions   Runners up   Third place   Fourth place

Head coaches
  Peter Eriksson (–2017)
  Noel Alm Johansson (2019–)

References

External links 
 
 Philippines - Team Card at the IFF

Philippines
Floorball
National team, Men's